Elections to the Metropolitan Borough of Bermondsey were held in 1934.

The borough had 12 wards which returned between 3 and 6 members. Of the 12 wards 1 of the wards had all candidates elected unopposed. Labour won all the seats.

Election result

|}

References

Council elections in the London Borough of Southwark
1934 in London
1934 English local elections
Bermondsey